Thorictus is a genus of beetles in the family Dermestidae, containing the following species:

 Thorictus algericus Chobaut Pic, 1897
 Thorictus abyssinicus John, 1963
 Thorictus aequabilis John, 1965
 Thorictus andreinii Escalera, 1942
 Thorictus angustus John, 1964
 Thorictus babadjanidis John, 1971
 Thorictus bacunus John, 1971
 Thorictus basalis John, 1968
 Thorictus baudii Reitter, 1881
 Thorictus baudoni John, 1967
 Thorictus becharensis Chobaut, 1924
 Thorictus beninensis Háva & Lackner, 2005
 Thorictus bifoveolatus Reitter, 1887
 Thorictus bonnairei Wasmann, 1894
 Thorictus braminus Wasmann, 1912
 Thorictus brevipennis John, 1963
 Thorictus buigasi Escalera, 1923
 Thorictus canariensis Wollaston, 1862
 Thorictus capensis Péringuey, 1886
 Thorictus castaneus Germar, 1834
 Thorictus ciliatus Reitter, 1881
 Thorictus cirenaicus John, 1965
 Thorictus cobosi John & Andreae, 1967
 Thorictus consimilis John, 1965
 Thorictus copticus John, 1963
 Thorictus crassus John, 1965
 Thorictus crinitus Andreae, 1967
 Thorictus deviedmai John, 1965
 Thorictus dilatipennis Reitter, 1881
 Thorictus dimidiatus Peyron, 1857
 Thorictus doderoi Escalera, 1942
 Thorictus doriae Escalera, 1942
 Thorictus ehlersii Perez, 1872
 Thorictus escalerai John, 1965
 Thorictus escorialanus John, 1965
 Thorictus fairmairei Raffray in Fairmaire & Raffray, 1873
 Thorictus feae Grouvelle, 1897
 Thorictus fiziensis John, 1961
 Thorictus foreli Wasmann, 1894
 Thorictus foveicollis Reitter, 1880
 Thorictus franzi John, 1967
 Thorictus fuhesanus John, 1964
 Thorictus gestroi Escalera, 1942
 Thorictus gigWollaston, 1862
 Thorictus grandiceps Pic, 1931
 Thorictus grandicollis Germar, 1842
 Thorictus hauseri John, 1965
 Thorictus heimi Wasmann, 1899
 Thorictus helleri John, 1963
 Thorictus hendeli Reitter, 1910
 Thorictus hilfi John, 1965
 Thorictus hoppi John, 1971
 Thorictus hottentotus Raffray, 1901
 Thorictus immutatus John, 1963
 Thorictus impressithorax Pic, 1930
 Thorictus incisicollis Pic, 1924
 Thorictus incultus John, 1971
 Thorictus indicus John, 1963
 Thorictus insulcatus Pic, 1924
 Thorictus irakensis John, 1963
 Thorictus kabulanus John, 1964
 Thorictus kandaharicus John, 1962
 Thorictus karoensis Andreae, 1967
 Thorictus kaznakovi R. Schmidt, 1904
 Thorictus khinjanus John, 1964
 Thorictus kifaruensis John, 1962
 Thorictus klapperichi John, 1964
 Thorictus kocheri John, 1965
 Thorictus kochi John, 1964
 Thorictus koenigi Reitter, 1887
 Thorictus kraatzi Wasmann, 1895
 Thorictus kurdistanus John, 1965
 Thorictus lederi Reitter, 1881
 Thorictus lethierryi Fairmaire, 1875
 Thorictus lindbergi John, 1963
 Thorictus longipennis Coye, 1869
 Thorictus lucasi John, 1965
 Thorictus lucusensis Escalera, 1923
 Thorictus manni Reichenspenger, 1926
 Thorictus marginicollis Schaum, 1859
 Thorictus marschalli John, 1963
 Thorictus martinsi Wasmann, 1925
 Thorictus mauritanicus Luc, 1846
 Thorictus mogadoricus Escalera, 1914
 Thorictus munganasti Reitter, 1908
 Thorictus myrmecophilus Reitter, 1881
 Thorictus nabeulanus John, 1964
 Thorictus namibensis John & Andreae, 1967
 Thorictus nanus John, 1964
 Thorictus nilgiriensis John, 1963
 Thorictus normandi Chobaut, 1924
 Thorictus obenbergeri John, 1965
 Thorictus olexai Háva, 2006
 Thorictus orientalis Peyron, 1857
 Thorictus ovalicollis Andreae, 1967
 Thorictus paganettii Obenberger, 1917
 Thorictus palmi John, 1964
 Thorictus parnassus John, 1971
 Thorictus pauciseta Wasmann, 1894
 Thorictus persicus Reitter, 1881
 Thorictus petranus John, 1965
 Thorictus peyerimhoffi Chobaut, 1904
 Thorictus pilosus Peyron, 1857
 Thorictus politus Wasmann, 1895
 Thorictus postangulus Reitter, 1895
 Thorictus procerus John, 1962
 Thorictus puncticollis Luc, 1846
 Thorictus punctithorax Reitter, 1860
 Thorictus quiquesulcatus John, 1964
 Thorictus rectangulatus John, 1965
 Thorictus reicherti Wasmann, 1912
 Thorictus reitteri John, 1963
 Thorictus rollei John, 1971
 Thorictus rotroui John, 1965
 Thorictus rotundithorax Escalera, 1942
 Thorictus ruzskii Semenov-Tian-Shanskiy, 1903
 Thorictus schatzmayri John, 1965
 Thorictus seriesetosus Fairmaire, 1870
 Thorictus sicilianus John, 1965
 Thorictus simillimus Escalera, 1914
 Thorictus simoni John, 1965
 Thorictus striatus Reitter, 1889
 Thorictus stricticollis Kraatz, 1859
 Thorictus studti John, 1971
 Thorictus subcastaneus Chobaut, 1898
 Thorictus subpusillus John, 1965
 Thorictus sulcicollis Perez Arc, 1868
 Thorictus tamadabanus John, 1964
 Thorictus tejedanus John & Andreae, 1967
 Thorictus tenerifanus John, 1965
 Thorictus testaceus Pic, 1930
 Thorictus theryi Chobaut, 1924
 Thorictus tripolitanus Escalera, 1942
 Thorictus trisulcatus Reitter, 1881
 Thorictus tuberosus Reitter, 1881
 Thorictus turneri John, 1963
 Thorictus ubanghiensis John, 1961
 Thorictus vaucheri Chobaut, 1924
 Thorictus vaulogeri Escalera, 1923
 Thorictus vestitus Wollaston, 1864
 Thorictus villosissimus Escalera, 1923
 Thorictus vonoertzeni John, 1971
 Thorictus walanganus John, 1964
 Thorictus wasmanni Reitter, 1895
 Thorictus wollastoni John, 1963

References

Dermestidae